Arabic language names have historically been based on a long naming system. Many people from the Arabic-speaking and also Muslim countries have not had given/middle/family names but rather a chain of names. This system remains in use throughout the Arabic and Muslim worlds.

Name structure

The  is the given name, first name, or personal name; e.g. "Ahmad" or "Fatimah". Most Arabic names have meaning as ordinary adjectives and nouns, and are often aspirational of character. For example, Muhammad means 'Praiseworthy' and Ali means 'Exalted' or 'High'.

The syntactic context will generally differentiate the name from the noun/adjective. However Arabic newspapers will occasionally place names in brackets, or quotation marks, to avoid confusion.

Indeed, such is the popularity of the name Muhammad throughout parts of Africa, Arabia, the Middle East, South Asia and Southeast Asia, it is often represented by the abbreviation "Md.", "Mohd.", "Muhd.", or just "M.".  In India, Pakistan, Bangladesh, Malaysia, Indonesia and the Philippines, due to its almost ubiquitous use as a first name, a person will often be referred to by their second name:
 Md. Dinar Ibn Raihan
 Mohd. Umair Tanvir
 Md. Osman

The nasab is a patronymic or matronymic, or a series thereof. It indicates the person's heritage by the word ibn ( "son of", colloquially bin) or ibnat ("daughter of", also  bint, abbreviated bte.).

Ibn Khaldun means "son of Khaldun". Khaldun is the father's personal name or, in this particular case, the name of a remote male ancestor.

ʿAmmār ibn Sumayya means "ʿAmmār son of Sumayya". Sumayya is the personal name of ʿAmmār's mother, the same person can also be identified by his father's personal name "ʿAmmār ibn Yasir". In later Islamic periods the nasab was an important tool in determining a child's father by means of describing paternity in a social (ie to whom was the mother legally married during the conception of the child), not a biological sense, because the father's biological identity can be grounds for speculation. In early Islamic contexts this function is not yet well established. This stems from a legal principle introduced by Islam regarding the legal status of children (they can only arise from marriage) and changes to waiting periods relating to divorce to establish an undisputed legal father for any child. This function only developing with Islam means that one can find many Companions of the Prophet bearing a maternal nasab, as the naming conventions reflected in their names still stem from pre-Islamic attitudes and beliefs.

Several nasab names can follow in a chain to trace a person's ancestry backwards in time, as was important in the tribal society of medieval Arabs, both for purposes of identification and for socio-political interactions. Today, however, ibn or bint is no longer used (unless it is the official naming style in a country, region, etc.: Adnen bin Abdallah).

The laqab, pl. alqāb can be translated to English as agnomen; cognomen; nickname; title, honorific; last name, surname, family name. The laqab is typically descriptive of the person.

An example is the Abbasid caliph Harun al-Rashid (of One Thousand and One Nights fame), which uses the definite article al-.  is the Arabic version of the name Aaron and  means "the Rightly-Guided".

Examples include Ṣalāḥ al-Dīn, Shams al-Dīn, Nūr al-Dīn, Nāṣir al-Dawla, Niẓām al-Mulk, Sayf al-Islām.

In ancient Arab societies, use of a laqab was common, but today is restricted to the surname, or family name, of birth.

The  surname could be an everyday name, but is mostly the name of the ancestral tribe, city, country, or any other term used to show relevance. It follows a family through several generations. It most often appears as a demonym, for example  , meaning that the person is of Baghdad or descendant of people from Baghdad.

The laqab and nisbah are similar in use, and hence, a name rarely contains both.

A kunya (kunyah) is a teknonym in Arabic names. It is a component of an Arabic name, a type of epithet, in theory referring to the bearer's first-born son or daughter. By extension, it may also have hypothetical or metaphorical references, e.g. in a nom de guerre or a nickname, without literally referring to a son or a daughter. For example, Sabri Khalil al-Banna was known as Abu Nidal, "father of struggle".

Use of a kunya implies a familiar but respectful setting.

A kunya is expressed by the use of abū (father) or umm (mother) in a genitive construction, i.e. "father of" or "mother of" as an honorific in place of or alongside given names in the Arab world.

A kunya may also be a nickname expressing the attachment of an individual to a certain thing, as in Abu Bakr, "father of the camel foal", given because of this person's kindness towards camels.

Common naming practices

Arab Muslim
A common name-form among Arab Muslims is the prefix  ("Worshipper") combined with the name of Allah (God),  ( "Worshipper of God"), or with one of the epithets of Allah.

As a mark of deference,  is usually not conjoined with the prophets' names. Nonetheless, such names are accepted in some areas.  Its use is not exclusive to Muslims and throughout all Arab countries, the name Abdel-Massih, "Servant of Christ", is a common Christian last name.

Converts to Islam may often continue using the native non-Arabic non-Islamic names that are without any polytheistic connotation, or association.

Arab Christian
To an extent Arab Christians have names indistinguishable from Muslims, except some explicitly Islamic names, e.g. Muhammad. Some common Christian names are:
 Arabic versions of Christian names (e.g. saints' names:  for Saint Peter).
 Names of Greek, Armenian, and Aramaic or Neo-Aramaic origin.
 Use of European names, especially French, Greek and, to a lesser extent, Spanish ones (in Morocco). This has been a relatively recent centuries-long convention for Christian Arabs, especially in the Levant. For example: Émile Eddé, George Habash, Charles Helou, Camille Chamoun.
 Names in honor of Jesus Christ:
  /  ("Servant of Jesus")
  (masc.) /  (fem.) ("Servant of the Messiah")
The root, means "to anoint" (as in masah) and is cognate to the Hebrew .

Dynastic or family name
Some people, especially in the Arabian Peninsula, when descendant of a famous ancestor, start their last name with Āl "family, clan", like the House of Saud  Āl Ṣaʻūd or Al ash-Sheikh ("family of the sheikh"). Āl is distinct from the definite article. If a reliably-sourced version of the Arabic spelling includes  (as a separate graphic word), then this is  a case of the definite article, so  (capitalised and followed by a space, not a hyphen) should be used.

Dynasty membership alone does  necessarily imply that the dynastic  is used – e.g. Bashar al-Assad.

Example

Muḥammad ibn Salmān ibn Amīn al-Fārisī

Ism – Muḥammad (proper name,  "praised")
Nasab – Salmān (father's name, lit. "secure")
Nasab – Amīn (grandfather's name, "trustworthy")
Nisbah – al-Fārisī ("the Persian").

"Muḥammad, son of Salmān, son of Amīn, the Persian"

This person would simply be referred to as "Muḥammad" or by his kunya, which relates him to his first-born son, e.g. Abū Karīm "father of Karīm". To signify respect or to specify which Muḥammad one is speaking about, the name could be lengthened to the extent necessary or desired.

Common mistakes 

Non-Arabic speakers often make these mistakes:
 Separating "the X of Y" word combinations (see iḍāfah):
 With "Abdul": Arabic names may be written "Abdul (something)", but "Abdul" means "servant of the" or "follower of the" and is not, by itself, a name. Thus for example, to address Abdul-Rahman bin Omar al-Ahmad by his given name, one says "Abdul-Rahman", not merely "Abdul". If he introduces himself as "Abdul-Rahman" (which means "the servant of the Merciful"), one does not say "Mr. Rahman" (as "Rahman" is not a family name but part of his [theophoric] personal name); instead it would be Mr. al-Ahmad, the latter being the family name.
 People not familiar with Arabic sandhi in iḍāfah: Habībullāh = "beloved (Habīb) of God (Allāh)"; here a person may in error report the man's name as "forename Habib, surname Ullah". Likewise, people may confuse a name such as Jalālu-d-dīn ("The majesty of the religion") as being "Jalal Uddin", or "Mr. Uddin", when "Uddin" is not a surname, but the second half of a two-word name (the desinence -u of the construct state nominative, plus the article, appearing as -d-, plus the genitive dīn[i]).  To add to the confusion, some immigrants to Western countries have adopted Uddin as a surname, although it is grammatically incorrect in Arabic outside the context of the associated "first name". Even Indian Muslims commit the same error. If a person's name is Abd-ul-Rahim ("servant of the Merciful"), others may call him Mr. Abdul ("servant of the") which would sound quite odd to a native speaker of Arabic.
 Not distinguishing  from : Some Muslim names include the Arabic word  ( "nobility"). Here, ⟨ʻ⟩ represents the ayin, a voiced pharyngeal fricative, ⟨ʾ⟩ represents the hamza, a glottal stop, and ⟨l⟩ is spelled and pronounced at ordinary length, /l/. In , the l is written twice (⟨ll⟩) and pronounced twice as long (a geminate), as /l/ or /ll/. But Europeans, Iranians, and Indians may not pronounce some Arabic sounds as a native Arabic speaker would, and thus tend to pronounce them identically. There is another name  (Aliullah, "the Nobility of God"), which uses both distinctly.
English-speakers often confuse them with middle names, especially when they're written as "Ben", as it is the case in some countries. For example, Sami Ben Ahmed would be mistakenly addressed as Mr. Ben Ahmed. To correctly address the person, one should use Mr. Sami Ahmed or Mr. Ahmed.
 Grammar: As between all languages, there are differences between Arabic grammar and the grammar of other languages. Arabic forms noun compounds in the opposite order from Indo-Iranian languages, for example. During the war in Afghanistan in 2002, a BBC team found in Kabul an internally displaced person whose name they stated as "Allah Muhammad". However, by the rules of Iranian languages and most languages of India, this name does mean "Muhammad who belongs to Allah", being the equivalent of the Arabic "Muhammadullah". Most Afghans speak Iranian languages. Such Perso-Arab or Indo-Arab multilingual compound names are not uncommon in Afghanistan, Bangladesh, Iran, Pakistan and Tajikistan. There is, for example, the Punjabi name Allah-Ditta which joins the Arabic Allah with the Punjabi Ditta "given".

Arab family naming convention
In Arabic culture, as in many parts of the world, a person's ancestry and family name are very important. An example is explained below.

Assume a man is called Saleh ibn Tariq ibn Khalid al-Fulan.
 Saleh is his personal name, and the one that his family and friends would call him by.
 ibn and bin translates as "son of", so Tariq is Saleh's father's name.
 ibn Khalid means that Tariq is the son of Khalid, making Khalid the grandfather of Saleh.
 al-Fulan would be Saleh's family name.
Hence, Saleh ibn Tariq ibn Khalid al-Fulan translates as "Saleh, son of Tariq, son of Khalid; who is of the family of al-Fulan."

The Arabic for "daughter of" is bint. A woman with the name Fatimah bint Tariq ibn Khalid al-Goswami translates as "Fatimah, daughter of Tariq, son of Khalid; who is of the family al-Goswami."

In this case, ibn and bint are included in the official naming. Most Arab countries today, however, do not use 'ibn' and 'bint' in their naming system. If Saleh were an Egyptian, he would be called Saleh Tariq Khalid al-Fulan and Fatimah would be Fatimah Tariq Khalid al-Goswami.

If Saleh marries a wife (who would keep her own maiden, family, and surnames), their children will take Saleh's family name. Therefore, their son Mohammed would be called Mohammed ibn Saleh ibn Tariq al-Fulan.

However, not all Arab countries use the name in its full length, but conventionally use two- and three-word names, and sometimes four-word names in official or legal matters. Thus the first name is the personal name, the middle name is the father's name and the last name is the family name.

Biblical names and their Arabic equivalent
The Arabic names listed below are used in the Arab world with correspondent Hebrew, English, Syriac and Greek equivalents in many cases. Most are derived from Syriac transliterations of the Hebrew Bible.

 The popular romanization of the Arabized and Hebrew names are written first, then the standardized romanization are written in oblique. Notice that Arabized names may have variants.
 If a literal Arabic translation of a name exists, it will be placed after the final standardized romanization. 
 If an Arabic correlation is ambiguous, (?) will be placed following the name in question.
 * Yassou' is the Arab Christian name, while ʿĪsā is the Muslim version of the name, as used in the Qur'an. There is debate as to which is the better rendition of the Aramaic Yeshua, because both names are of late origin.
 ** Youhanna is the Arab Christian name of John, while Yahya is the Muslim version of the name, as used in the Qur'an. They have completely different triconsonantal roots: H-N-N ("grace") vs H-Y-Y ("Life").  Specifically, Youhanna may be the Biblical John the Baptist or the apostle.  Yahya refers specifically to John the Baptist.
 El, the Hebrew word for strength/might or deity, is usually represented as īl in Arabic, although it carries no meaning in classical and modern Arabic. The only exception is its usage in the Iraqi Arabic.

Indexing
According to the Chicago Manual of Style, Arabic names are indexed by their surnames. Names may be alphabetized under Abu, Abd and ibn, while names are not alphabetized under al- and el- and are instead alphabetized under the following element.

See also
List of Arabic star names
List of Arabic place names

References

External links
 Arabic Nomenclature: A summary guide for beginners. A.F.L. Beeston (Oxford, 1971).
Period Arabic Names and Naming Practices (2003) by Da'ud ibn Auda (David B. Appleton)
 Automated recognition of Arabic person names

Names by culture
Arabic language